Find Me A Family is a British television series with the aim of rehoming of disadvantaged children with adoptive parents. This three-part series aired on Channel 4 in 2009 as part of the channel's Britain's Forgotten Children season.  It follows the course of three families taking part in a project to rehome children in care who would otherwise be overlooked. Subsequently it was used as a training aid to educate prospective adopters in the United Kingdom.

References

External links

Find Me a Family at Channel4.com

Channel 4 documentary series
2009 British television series debuts
2009 British television series endings
2000s British documentary television series
Television series by All3Media
English-language television shows